HMS Juno was an  protected cruiser built for the Royal Navy in the mid-1890s.

Juno was assigned to the 11th Cruiser Squadron operating from Ireland.

In 1901, she was one of two escort ships for HMS Ophir, which carried the Duke and Duchess of Cornwall and York (later King George V and Queen Mary) during their tour of the British Empire.

The following year she served in the cruiser squadron under the command of Captain Henry Peter Routh. In May 1902 she was taken into Portsmouth for a refit, and the following month Captain David Beatty was appointed in command. She took part in the fleet review held at Spithead on 16 August 1902 for the coronation of King Edward VII, and visited the Aegean Sea for combined manoeuvres with other ships of the Channel squadron and Mediterranean Fleet the following month. After returning to Portsmouth in October, she carried the Lord-Lieutenant of Ireland and Lady Dudley on a visit to Waterford on 29 October. She was posted to the Mediterranean Fleet later that year, but Beatty paid her off not long after.

In 1915 she was sent to the Persian Gulf and took part in an engagement at Bushire in July – August 1915 against Tangistani raids under Rais Ali Delvari. 
Juno was returning to Queenstown, Ireland. Having received warning of submarine activity off Queenstown, the cruiser took evasive action and eventually returned to port. This warning was not extended to RMS Lusitania, which was sunk by a U Boat on Friday, 7 May 1915.

In November 1916 Juno carried Abdulaziz bin Abdul Rahman Al Saud to Bushire to visit Sir Percy Cox, the British Political Resident in the Persian Gulf.

Juno was sold for scrap in 1920.

Footnotes

References

External links
 

 

Ships built in Barrow-in-Furness
Eclipse-class cruisers
1895 ships